{{Speciesbox
| image =
| image_caption = 
| genus = Brachyopa
| species = minima
| display_parents = 4
| authority = Vujic & Pérez-Bañón, 2016<ref name="Perez-BanonRadenkovicVujicPetanidou2016">{{cite journal |last1=Perez-Banon |first1=C. |last2=Radenkovic |first2=S. |last3=Vujic |first3=A. |last4=Petanidou |first4=T. |title=Brachyopa minima (Diptera: Syrphidae), a new species for, Greece with notes on the biodiversity and conservation of the genus Brachyopa Meigen in the northern Aegean Islands |journal=Zootaxa |date=2016 |volume=4072 |pages=217-234 |url=https://www.researchgate.net/profile/Theodora_Petanidou/publication/292176439_Brachyopa_minima_Diptera_Syrphidae_a_new_species_from_Greece_with_notes_on_the_biodiversity_and_conservation_of_the_genus_Brachyopa_Meigen_in_the_Northern_Aegean_Islands/links/570d0ee408aed31341cf018e/Brachyopa-minima-Diptera-Syrphidae-a-new-species-from-Greece-with-notes-on-the-biodiversity-and-conservation-of-the-genus-Brachyopa-Meigen-in-the-Northern-Aegean-Islands.pdf |access-date=13 November 2021}}</ref>
| synonyms = 
}}Brachyopa minima'' is a European species of hoverfly.

Distribution
Greece

References

Diptera of Europe
Eristalinae
Insects described in 2004